The   A 6  is a Portuguese motorway which runs east from Marateca (a short distance from Lisbon) to the Portugal–Spain border, near Elvas, where it connects to the Autovía A-5 in Spain.

Since 1999 the highway has formed part of the principal road linking Lisbon with Madrid.

At its western end the road connects with the A2 approximately 50 km (30 miles) south-east of Lisbon, but while the A2 swings to the south the A6 continues east passing through the Alto Alentejo via Montemor-o-Novo, Évora and the Estremoz marble quarries.  It then continues past Borba and Elvas, the Portuguese part of the road terminating at the crossing of the Caia River which here forms the frontier with Spain.

Apart from the most easterly section approaching the frontier, the road is the responsibility of Brisa, the Portuguese highway operator. The toll for a Class 1 vehicle (normal motor car) travelling the full distance from Marateca to Elvas  is €11.95 (2010).

The road carries very little traffic.

References

Motorways in Portugal
European route E90